Mileč is a municipality and village in Plzeň-South District in the Plzeň Region of the Czech Republic. It has about 300 inhabitants.

Administrative parts
Villages of Bezděkovec, Maňovice, Záhoří and Želvice are administrative parts of Mileč.

References

Villages in Plzeň-South District